Albert Eugene Chambers (born March 24, 1961) is an American former professional baseball player from  to  for the Seattle Mariners of Major League Baseball (MLB). Chambers was the first pick overall in the 1979 MLB draft out of high school by the Mariners, but proved a disappointment, as he only appeared in fifty-seven games in his career. In that same draft, the Toronto Blue Jays drafted catcher Jay Schroeder, who'd go on to be an NFL quarterback. That first round also produced Tim Leary, Andy Van Slyke, Steve Buechele, Brad Komminsk, Tim Wallach, Rick Leach and Jerry Don Gleaton, all of whom would go on to have long MLB careers compared to Chambers.

References

External links

Retrosheet
Venezuelan Professional Baseball League

1961 births
Living people
African-American baseball players
American expatriate baseball players in Canada
American expatriate baseball players in Mexico
Baseball players from Harrisburg, Pennsylvania
Bellingham Mariners players
Calgary Cannons players
Columbus Astros players
Leones del Caracas players
Lynn Sailors players
Major League Baseball designated hitters
Major League Baseball outfielders
Mexican League baseball players
Navegantes del Magallanes players
American expatriate baseball players in Venezuela
Pittsfield Cubs players
Rieleros de Aguascalientes players
Salt Lake City Gulls players
San Jose Missions players
Seattle Mariners players
Sultanes de Monterrey players
Tigres del México players
21st-century African-American people
20th-century African-American sportspeople